Starry Nights in Western Sahara is an album compiled by filmmaker Danielle Smith, in the process of making one of her documentaries on Western Sahara. Starry Nights, published by North-American label Rounder Records, is the second compilation of Saharawi music released in the United States, after Sahrauis: The Music of the Western Sahara. The majority of the songs are sung by Umm Mekiya, a woman notorious for her voice. Songs range from traditional love songs to contemporary songs of political protest, accompanied with rhythmic clapping, lutes and tidinit.

Track listing

References

2003 compilation albums
Folk albums by Sahrawi artists
Rounder Records compilation albums
Folk compilation albums
World music compilation albums
Arabic-language compilation albums
World music albums by Sahrawi artists
Compilation albums by Sahrawi artists